Charles G. Pope   was an American teacher, lawyer and politician  who served as a member and President of the Somerville, Massachusetts Common Council and as the  seventh Mayor of Somerville, Massachusetts.

Notes

1893 deaths
Mayors of Somerville, Massachusetts
Massachusetts city council members
Year of birth missing